Three is a 2016 Hong Kong–Chinese action film produced and directed by Johnnie To and starring Zhao Wei, Louis Koo and Wallace Chung. The film was released on 24 June 2016 in China and 30 June 2016 in Hong Kong, while it is also the closing film of the 2016 Taipei Film Festival on 10 July 2016.

Plot
Shun (Wallace Chung), a thug, is shot in the head by a cop due to miscommunication during an interrogation and is taken to the hospital. In the hospital, he claims human rights to refuse surgery to remove the bullet inside his head in order to bide time for his underlings to rescue him. The detective (Louis Koo) in charge sees through Shun's scheme but decides to play along so as to capture his whole gang once and for all.

Cast
Zhao Wei as Dr. Tong Qian
Louis Koo as Ken (Chief Inspector)
Wallace Chung as Shun (Gangster)
Lo Hoi-pang as Chung (Patient)
Cheung Siu-fai as Dr. Fok
Lam Suet as Fatty (Constable)
Mimi Kung as Advance Practice Nurse
Timmy Hung as Chak (Patient)
Michael Tse as Gangster
Raymond Wong as Gangster
Jonathan Wong as Hung (Patient)
Stephen Au as Tong (Sergeant)
Mickey Chu (credited as Chu Kin-kwan) as Dr. Steven Chow
Cheung Kwok-keung as Mr. Ng (Patient)
Helen Tam (credited as Tam Yuk-ying) as Mrs. Ng (Visitor)
Luvin Ho (credited as Ching Wai) as Ho (Senior Inspector)
Sire Ma as Journalist
Zhang Yaodong (credited as Teoh Yeow Tong) as Neurosurgery Student

Production
Production for Three began in Guangzhou in March 2015 wrapped up on 24 July of the same year. The film was mainly shot in a hospital that was built by the props team.

Reception
The film has grossed  in China. On review aggregator website Rotten Tomatoes, the film has a 91% "fresh" rating based on 23 reviews. Metacritic reports a 71 out of 100 rating based on 10 critics, indicating "generally favorable reviews".

Awards and nominations

References

External links

2016 films
2016 action thriller films
Hong Kong action thriller films
Police detective films
Media Asia films
Milkyway Image films
2010s Cantonese-language films
Films directed by Johnnie To
Films set in hospitals
Films shot in Guangzhou
Chinese action thriller films
Films with screenplays by Yau Nai-hoi
Triad films
2010s Hong Kong films